This is a list of Canadian television personalities. It should only include people associated with non-fiction programming, not actors.

A
Steve Anthony, MuchMusic VJ and morning show host
Thalia Assuras, newscaster
Nahlah Ayed, journalist

B
Bryan Baeumler
Isabel Bassett, journalist
Ralph Benmergui, journalist and talk show host
Rod Black, sportscaster
Mike Bullard, talk show host
Arlene Bynon, talk show host

C
Elaine Callei, 1970s daytime talk show host and cohost of Canada AM
Rick Campanelli, entertainment reporter and MuchMusic VJ
Maggie Cassella, talk show host
Erin Cebula
Don Cherry, sportscaster
Catherine Clark, journalist
Tom Clark, newscaster
Adrienne Clarkson, arts journalist
Steven Cojocaru, fashion critic and correspondent for Entertainment Tonight
Ernie Coombs, children's entertainer known as "Mr. Dressup"

D
Sarah Daniels
Marilyn Denis, talk show host
Bernard Derome, newscaster
Alexandre Despatie
James Doohan
Dwight Drummond, newscaster
Francis D'Souza, journalist
Mario Dumont, talk show host
Philip DuMoulin
Darren Dutchyshen, sportscaster

E
Rosey Edeh
Tyrone Edwards, MuchMusic and eTalk
Erica Ehm, MuchMusic VJ
Mary Jo Eustace, cooking show host

F
Peter Fallico
Jebb Fink, talk show host
Dave Foley, Etobicoke comedian
Kevin Frankish
Dawna Friesen, newscaster
Liza Fromer

G
Vicki Gabereau, talk show host
Martine Gaillard, sportscaster
 Chris Gailus, newscaster
 Céline Galipeau, newscaster
Sean Gehon, entertainment reporter
Tom Gibney
Anne-France Goldwater, court show judge
Bill Good, newscaster
Richard Gizbert
Tom Green, Pembroke
Peter Gzowski, talk show host

H
Avery Haines, newscaster
Monty Hall, game show host
Adrian Harewood, newscaster
Phil Hartman, sketch comedian
Jane Hawtin, talk show host
Jennifer Hedger, sportscaster
Cheryl Hickey, entertainment reporter
Heather Hiscox, newscaster
Johnny Hockin
Mike Holmes, home renovation contractor
Bob Homme, children's entertainer known as "The Friendly Giant"
Tommy Hunter, variety show host
Helen Hutchinson, journalist
Chris Hyndman, HGTV designer and talk show host

I
Marci Ien, newscaster and talk show host
Orin Isaacs, talk show bandleader

J
Doug James, former CNN correspondent, former CBC reporter and host
Stu Jeffries, VJ
Peter Jennings, newscaster
Jenny Jones, London television host

K
Arthur Kent, journalist
Peter Kent, newscaster
Tanya Kim
Harvey Kirck, newscaster
Ken Kostick, cooking show host
Elvira Kurt
Keltie Knight, entertainment journalist

L
Lisa LaFlamme, newscaster
Amanda Lang, business newscaster
Ricardo Larrivée, chef
René Lecavalier
Philippe Létourneau, driving expert
Art Linkletter, talk show host
Elaine "Lainey" Lui, entertainment reporter and talk show host

M
Ron MacLean, sportscaster
Rita MacNeil, variety show host
Howie Mandel
Peter Mansbridge, newscaster
Jay Manuel
Pamela Martin, newscaster
Gord Martineau, newscaster
Shahir Massoud, chef and talk show host
Bob McAdorey, entertainment reporter
Mark McKinney, Ottawa comedian
Ann Medina, journalist and documentarian
Anne-Marie Mediwake, newscaster
Suhana Meharchand, newscaster
Rick Mercer, comedian and commentator
Wendy Mesley, journalist
Jon Montgomery, The Amazing Race Canada
Tracy Moore, talk show host
Anne Mroczkowski, newscaster
Ben Mulroney

N
Pascale Nadeau, newscaster
Kevin Newman, newscaster

O
Candice Olson
David Onley, journalist
Jay Onrait, sportscaster
Seamus O'Regan, journalist
Dan O'Toole, sportscaster
Dvira Ovadia

P
Amanda Parris
Tony Parsons, newscaster
Norm Perry, newscaster
Russell Peters, comedian
Dini Petty, talk show host
Benjamin Quddus Philippe, MTV presenter
Suzanne Pinel, children's entertainer known as "Marie-Soleil"
Sue Prestedge, sportscaster
Valerie Pringle, newscaster
Dina Pugliese, talk show host

Q

R
Joel Recla, radio and television creator, producer, and host
Graham Richardson, newscaster
Sarah Richardson, HGTV designer
Sandie Rinaldo, newscaster
Sandra Rinomato, HGTV host (Property Virgins, Buy Herself)
John Roberts, news reporter
Leslie Roberts, newscaster
Lloyd Robertson, newscaster
Ken Rockburn, talk show host
Ann Rohmer, newscaster

S
Steven Sabados, HGTV designer and talk show host
Morley Safer, Toronto-born television reporter
Simi Sara
Joe Schlesinger, journalist and documentarian
Ken Shaw, newscaster
Trish Stratus, WWE wrestler and star of the TV show Armed and Famous
George Stroumboulopoulos, talk show host
David Suzuki
Diana Swain, newscaster

T
Jane Taber
Tamara Taggart
Mutsumi Takahashi, newscaster
Jan Tennant, newscaster
Scott Thompson, sketch comedian
Beverly Thomson, journalist
Kathy Tomlinson, Canadian Broadcasting Corporation reporter
Ziya Tong
Cheryl Torrenueva
Debbie Travis
Alex Trebek, game show host
Peter Trueman, newscaster

U

V
Jennifer Valentyne
Jody Vance, sportscaster
Adnan Virk

W
Bill Walker, variety and game show host
Pamela Wallin, journalist and talk show host
Patrick Watson, journalist and documentarian
Bill Welychka, MuchMusic VJ
Murray Westgate, advertising pitchman
Roz Weston
Brian Williams, sportscaster
Harland Williams, sketch comedian

X

Y
Benny Yau
Elwy Yost, TV host of classic movies on TVO's Magic Shadows and Saturday Night at the Movies
Andrew Younghusband

Z
Mary Zilba, star of Real Housewives of Vancouver

References

Television personalities
Personalities